Cicindela nebraskana, known generally as the prairie long-lipped tiger beetle or black-bellied tiger beetle, is a species of flashy tiger beetle in the family Carabidae. It is found in North America. It grows between 12 and 13 mm in length, and is black in colour.

References

Further reading

 
 

nebraskana
Articles created by Qbugbot
Beetles described in 1909